Osage is a census-designated place and unincorporated community in Osage Township, Becker County, Minnesota, United States. Its population was 323 as of the 2010 census.

Demographics

References

Census-designated places in Becker County, Minnesota
Census-designated places in Minnesota